UFC Fight Night: dos Anjos vs. Alvarez (also known as UFC Fight Night 90) was a mixed martial arts event held on July 7, 2016 at the MGM Grand Garden Arena in Las Vegas, Nevada.

Background
The event was the first of three events in as many days in Las Vegas, culminating with UFC 200. It also marked the second North American card to air live exclusively on their subscription-based digital network, UFC Fight Pass, and the first men's championship fight broadcast over that medium.

The event was headlined by a UFC Lightweight Championship bout between then-champion Rafael dos Anjos and former two-time Bellator Lightweight Champion Eddie Alvarez.

A lightweight bout between John Makdessi and Mehdi Baghdad, originally scheduled for UFC 199, was moved to this event possibly to bolster the card.

Nordine Taleb was expected to face Alan Jouban at the event, but pulled out on June 7 due to injury. He was replaced by promotional newcomer Belal Muhammad.

Results

Bonus awards
The following fighters were awarded $50,000 bonuses:
Fight of the Night: Alan Jouban vs. Belal Muhammad
Performance of the Night: Eddie Alvarez and Pedro Munhoz

Reported payout
The following is the reported payout to the fighters as reported to the Nevada State Athletic Commission. It does not include sponsor money and also does not include the UFC's traditional "fight night" bonuses.

 Eddie Alvarez: $150,000 (no win bonus) def. Rafael dos Anjos: $310,000
 Derrick Lewis: $66,000 (includes $33,000 win bonus) def. Roy Nelson: $100,000
 Alan Jouban: $42,000 (includes $24,000 win bonus) def. Belal Muhammad: $12,000
 Joseph Duffy: $40,000 (includes $20,000 win bonus) def. Mitch Clarke: $12,000
 Alberto Mina: $24,000 (includes $12,000 win bonus) def. Mike Pyle: $55,000
 John Makdessi: $60,000 (includes $30,000 win bonus) def. Mehdi Baghdad: $12,000
 Anthony Birchak: $24,000 (includes $12,000 win bonus) def. Dileno Lopes: $12,000 
 Pedro Munhoz: $34,000 (includes $17,000 win bonus) def. Russell Doane: $11,000
 Felipe Arantes: $42,000 (includes $21,000 win bonus) def. Jerrod Sanders: $12,000
 Gilbert Burns: $34,000 (includes $17,000 win bonus) def. Łukasz Sajewski: $10,000
 Marco Beltran: $24,000 (includes $12,000 win bonus) def. Reginaldo Vieira: $17,000
 Vicente Luque: $24,000 (includes $12,000 win bonus) def. Álvaro Herrera: $12,000

See also
List of UFC events
2016 in UFC

References

UFC Fight Night
July 2016 sports events in the United States
Mixed martial arts in Las Vegas
2016 in mixed martial arts
MGM Grand Garden Arena